Provincial Road 203 (PR 203) is a provincial road in the southeastern part of the Canadian province of Manitoba.

Route description
It runs east to Woodridge, southeast to Badger, and then south to its terminus at PTH 12. From here, the road continues south as PTH 89, a paved highway leading to Piney and the Pinecreek–Piney Border Crossing.

PR 203 lies within Sandilands Provincial Forest and is a gravel road in its entirety.

References

External links
Official Manitoba Highway Map

203